Lĩnh Nam is a ward of Hoàng Mai District in Hanoi, Vietnam.

References

Communes of Hanoi
Populated places in Hanoi